Twelfth cake may refer to:

 a king cake, baked for the festival of Twelfth Night
 The Troelfth Cake, a satirical drawing of the Partition of Poland